Tamaraikulam is a village in India near Kanyakumari. On the advent of Ayyavazhi and the Swamithoppepathi, the administrative unit was divided and part of it north to Swamithope is called North Tamaraikulam  and south as South Tamaraikulam.

Thamaraiyur is the alternative name given for the village and the source for Ayyavazhi mythology.

Villages in Kanyakumari district
Ayyavazhi mythology